South Dakota Highway 48 (SD 48) is a  state highway in Union County, South Dakota, United States, that begins at Interstate 29, about  west of Spink, and becomes Big Sioux River Road, formerly Iowa Highway 403, northwest of Akron, Iowa.

Route description
From its western terminus, SD 48 travels due east. It nearly immediately meets County Road 1C (CR 1C), an old alignment of US 77.  east of the CR 1C intersection, SD 48 passes through the town of Spink.

East of Spink, SD 48 gently curves to the north as it descends a rolling hill towards Brule Creek. After crossing the stream, the highway ascends, bending back to the south to resume its due east course. Over the next several miles, the road remains arrow-straight while traversing gently rolling farmland. About  from the SD 11 junction, SD 48 crosses a bridge over West Union Creek;  later, it crosses East Union Creek. For the remainder of the route, the road gradually S-curves southwest into the Big Sioux River valley. At the Big Sioux River, the road crosses the Iowa state line and ends.

History
South Dakota 48 was established on a previously unnumbered highway between 1948 and 1953. It began at U.S. Highway 77 (current Union County Road 1C). No significant changes have been made, except for a slight extension to meet Interstate 29 to the west, and a slight realignment at the Iowa border.

Major intersections

See also

 List of state highways in South Dakota

References

External links

048
Transportation in Union County, South Dakota